The Fiddler is a supervillain appearing in American comic books published by DC Comics, as an enemy of the first Flash.

Isaac Bowin appeared in the first two seasons of Stargirl, portrayed by Max Frantz. Additionally, two female incarnations of the Fiddler appear in The Flash, portrayed by Miranda MacDougall and Magda Apanowicz.

Publication history
Fiddler first appeared in All-Flash #32 (December 1947/January 1948) and was created by Robert Kanigher and Lee Elias.

Earlier, a character with the same name, though only superficially similar, appeared in multiple Action Comics episodes of the Vigilante (starting with Action Comics #59, April 1943 cover date).

Fictional character biography
The Fiddler's history was changed somewhat during the Crisis on Infinite Earths.

Pre-Crisis
The Fiddler started out as a thief who was arrested in India and sent to jail. While in prison, he met a fakir, charming a snake in his cell, who taught him the "mystic art" of Indian music. For the next five years, he learned the fakir's secret and made a crude violin made of material he could scrounge in the prison. He developed the ability to use his violin to play sounds that could either hypnotize others, shatter objects, or create barriers. After the fakir declared his student had surpassed him, he used the instrument to hypnotize the guards to open their cells and he and the fakir escaped. He then murdered the fakir and the merchant who had him arrested in the first place.

Returning to America, the Fiddler, as he called himself, made his first stop at Keystone City. While the Fiddler managed to humiliate the Flash (Jay Garrick) the first time they met, Flash was able to foil his plan, which involved replacing Maestro Bowin, a violin virtuoso, who was actually the Fiddler's twin brother. The physical similarity between the brothers (who had been separated at birth) also led to Bowin briefly being suspected of the Fiddler's crimes. The Fiddler captured his brother and Flash, but they escaped and the Fiddler apparently committed suicide by diving into a river. As is the case more often than not, the Fiddler survived his plunge into the river and returned to battle the Flash again a few months later. The villain refined his appearance, shaving his dark locks and donning the powdered white wig that became his trademark for the remainder of his life. After the Flash thwarts a petty theft and arrests most of his gang, the Fiddler followed the hero at a distance but was in time to piece together a quarrel between Flash and Joan Williams. The exchange, with Joan annoyed at the time Flash's life took him away from home, inspired the Fiddler to undermine the hero. Using local criminals, the Fiddler arranged for "common citizens" (really members of his gang) to demonstrate that the Flash was not needed. As the Flash arrived always just in time to see the "citizens" route the criminals, he was advised to rest, relax or take a vacation. Eventually, the tricks took their toll and the Flash announced his retirement. As soon as he had supposedly departed, the Fiddler instigated a reign of terror across Keystone, staging almost daily robberies. One evening, Joan was particularly regretful of her admonition of the Flash and took it upon herself to resolve the situation. Using mirrors to blur her form and give her the illusion of speed, she donned a spare uniform and took up pursuit of the Fiddler. While the athletic Joan was quite capable of dealing with ordinary thugs, she was no match for a master criminal such as the Fiddler. To the criminal's astonishment, The Flash appeared to be a woman. Nonetheless, the Fiddler resolved to dispose of her and tied her to the trellis of a nearby train track. As the train bore down on her bound form, the genuine Flash quickly rescued her and bore down on the Fiddler. Not to be easily taken, the Fiddler dove between the ties, falling to his presumed death.

Since then, he continued to plague the Flash again and again. He was a member of the second Injustice Society, who captured the JSA and briefly put them under their control before the Harlequin and the Black Canary restored their memories. At Liberty Hall in Independence City, the citizens of that town have gathered en masse to protect the Freedom Bell from the Injustice Society, when strange music suddenly makes everyone want to dance. The music, played by the Fiddler, works like a charm until Dr. Mid-Nite and Wonder Woman show up and seemingly put an end to the fiendish fiddle. But the Fiddler suddenly recovers, plays a few notes (which causes the Freedom Bell to fall on top the duo, trapping them), and he pumps gas inside to overcome them. Unfortunately for the Fiddler, the bell is cracked and the JSA pair survive the effects of the gas by breathing fresh air through that crack. Still, the Fiddler has been warned that, as a last resort, to snap his fingers to put the JSA members back under their hypnotic trance, which he does—and all three then drive away in the Fiddler's Fiddlemobile with the bell in tow. The other JSA members are captured in this way, but again Black Canary and the Harlequin restore the JSAer's minds.

Later, the Fiddler was part of a trio of criminals that caused the original Flash to come out of retirement. The Fiddler, along with the Shade and the Thinker, were stopped by the first of many team-ups of Earth-One and Earth-Two heroes in the classic "Flash of Two Worlds" story from The Flash #123 (September 1961). Barry Allen, the Earth-1 Flash, visited Earth-2 accidentally and looked up his comic book hero, the original Flash. Together, the two Flashes stopped the villains, despite the Fiddler briefly placing them both under his control. This issue led to many other team-ups between Earth-1 and Earth-2 heroes and villains. The Fiddler, with the Wizard and the Icicle formed the "Crime Champions" who, with the Crime Champions of Earth-1 (Doctor Alchemy, Chronos, and Felix Faust), tried to commit robberies after the Fiddler accidentally discovered a way to travel across the vibratory barriers between the Earths during a jailbreak. This led to the first JLA/JSA team-up. The Fiddler, while committing a million-dollar robbery on Earth-2 escaped Hawkman, the Earth-2 Flash, and the Atom, though the Flashes from both Earths were captured and placed in vibratory spheres, as they might recognize the criminals due to their ability to travel between Earths. Eventually, the villains starting committing crimes on each other's worlds. Using the Wizard's Tibetan magic, the Earth-2 crooks impersonated the Earth-1 crooks, the Fiddler impersonating Felix Faust, and battling Aquaman, the Martian Manhunter, and the Atom. When the Fiddler tried to rob a Museum on Earth-1 in his true form, Hourman and the Earth-2 Atom stopped him. However, the heroes were imprisoned by the Crime Champions in cages in space, but the Green Lanterns helped them to escape and return to Earth, after which the crooks were defeated and jailed on their respective Earths.

Post-Crisis
The son of British aristocrats, Isaac Bowin had a talent for music, and an impulse to travel. Running out of money, he resorted to theft and robbery to make ends meet until he was arrested in India and sent to jail. He then met a fakir, much as in the Pre-Crisis version.

Returning to America and taking on a new identity, that of the Fiddler, Bowin made his first stop at Keystone City. The main difference between this new origin and the original story is that he was aware Maestro Bowin was his twin and wanted to ruin his brother's good name. He continued to plague Jay Garrick for many years, eventually joining with the Thinker and the Shade to remove Keystone City from the world's vision and memory. Barry Allen inadvertently crossed the vibrational barrier the Fiddler created in Grant Morrison's Post-Crisis version of the first Jay/Barry team-up, "Flash of Two Cities." As in the original story, the two Flashes defeated the villains together.

During the 1986 DC mini-series Legends, the people of America are turned against heroes, and a law was made that no one could operate legally wearing a costume. 

For the Fiddler, this period proved an opportune time to join with his old comrade the Wizard in his new Injustice Society, now called "Injustice Unlimited". They overcame the security at the International Trade Conference in Calgary, Canada, namely Infinity, Inc. and a contingent of the Global Guardians. They forced the heroes to help in some mayhem. The Fiddler took Obsidian and the Green Flame to London and, with their help, stole a very prized Stradivarius violin. They then returned to Calgary to share in the stolen wealth being gathered by the Wizard but the plan went haywire when Hourman (Rick Tyler) revived and freed himself, as well as when Solomon Grundy was brought in from the Arctic Circle. It was Hourman who incapacitated the Fiddler by destroying the Stradivarius, and after the confusion he was taken into custody by Canadian law enforcement.

In John Ostrander's Hawkworld series, it was revealed that the fakir who taught Bowin his hypnotic skills was actually a demon. The Fiddler apparently dies in that story, but has resurfaced since (possibly through the machinations of the demon Neron, since the Fiddler first reappeared alive in Neron's assembly of supervillains in Underworld Unleashed #1). The same demon would turn a heavy-metal guitarist into a 1990s version of the Fiddler called the Thrasher. The Thrasher was defeated by Hawkman, and has not reappeared. It is not clear if this version of the Fiddler's origin is still in continuity.

An Iowa Bowin, claiming to be the Fiddler's great-grandson, appeared in a story set in the future. Although his guitar-based version of his great-grandfather's powers initially caused chaos, he wished to be a hero, working alongside Kid Flash.

In the first issue of the Infinite Crisis miniseries Villains United, the Fiddler has joined the Secret Six. Disappointed by the Fiddler's performance against H.I.V.E. agents during their first mission, Mockingbird deems him "incompetent" and orders him killed. Deadshot carries out the execution; following the Fiddler's death, he is replaced on the team by Catman. The Fiddler's violin is later found to be in the possession of the Virtuoso, a woman allied with the Society. Most recently though, a man resembling the Fiddler makes a cameo in Green Arrow/Black Canary, shown upset in a room filled with violins destroyed by a recent fight between the Green Arrow, the Black Canary, and a mugger outside.

The Fiddler has been identified as one of the deceased entombed below the Hall of Justice. He is one of many dead super-villains reanimated as members of the Black Lantern Corps. He features prominently as a Black Lantern during a short story-arc running through the one-shot revival issue of Suicide Squad, and the following two issues of Secret Six. The Fiddler is apparently destroyed.

In "DC Rebirth," Fiddler was seen in Zambia partaking in a card game with Psych, Shrike, and Vortex. When Psych detected that Fiddler cheated, Fiddler is held at gun point only for all of them to be killed by the projections of the people they killed.

Eobard Thawne plucked Fiddler from an unspecified point in time and recruited him to join the Legion of Zoom.

Powers and abilities
The Fiddler possesses magical abilities that he channels through his violins. The musical vibrations he creates can shatter solid objects, create force-fields and hypnotize others due to the sheer amount of sub-level bass.

He uses violins gimmicked with weapons such as blades and guns. He travels around in his Fiddle Car, which Jay Garrick recognizes by sight.

Other characters named Fiddler
There are other characters who went by the name Fiddler:

There is an unnamed man who operated as Fiddler and was an enemy of Bulletman and Bulletgirl. His fiddle enabled him to hypnotize anyone.

Prior to Isaac Bowin's debut, a man named Benjamin Bowe operated as Fiddler and was an enemy of Vigilante and Stuff the Chinatown Kid.

In other media

Television
 A character based on the Fiddler called the Music Master appears in the Justice League two-part episode "Legends", voiced by Udo Kier.
 The Fiddler makes a non-speaking cameo appearance in the Justice League Unlimited episode "Flash and Substance".
 Two female incarnations of the Fiddler appear in The Flash.
 The first, a genderbent version of Isaac Bowin named Izzy Bowin (portrayed by Miranda MacDougall), appears in the episode "Subject 9" as a country singer and violinist who was exposed to dark matter released from the Flash's emergence from the Speed Force as part of the Thinker's plans. This caused her to gain the ability to fire concussive sonic waves. The Flash and the Elongated Man try to protect her when she is targeted by the Thinker, giving her a fiddle with which she can channel her powers through, but the villain succeeds in stealing Izzy's body and powers, killing her in the process.
 The second incarnation, Andrea Wozzeck (portrayed by Magda Apanowicz), appears in the ninth season as a member of the Red Death's Rogues who can manipulate soundwaves through objects that produce sound, such as her fiddle built from Wayne Enterprises technology.
 A variation of the Fiddler and their legacy appears in Stargirl.
 The original Fiddler appears in a photograph depicted in the episode "S.T.R.I.P.E." that identified him as a member of the Injustice Society of America (ISA), was referenced in the episode "Hourman and Dr. Mid-Nite" as having been an Irishman and enemy of the Justice Society of America (JSA), and shown in a flashback in the episode "Shiv" Pt. 1, portrayed by an uncredited Timmy Sherrill.
 In the present, his wife Principal Anaya Bowin (portrayed by Hina Khan) took over his legacy and role within the ISA until she is killed by fellow ISA members Sportsmaster and Tigress for insulting them, with Anaya's death being covered up as a hunting accident.
 Fiddler and Anaya's son, Isaac Bowin (portrayed by Max Frantz), is depicted as a young musical prodigy and classmate of Courtney Whitmore who is often picked on by bullies. In the second season, Cindy Burman reveals Isaac's family's legacy to him before recruiting him into Injustice Unlimited. However, he is later consumed by Eclipso while fighting Whitmore's JSA.

Miscellaneous
 The Fiddler appears in issue #8 of the Justice League Unlimited tie-in comic book series.
 The Fiddler makes a cameo in Batman: The Brave and the Bold #15.

See also
 List of Flash enemies

References

External links

Comics characters introduced in 1948
Characters created by Lee Elias
Characters created by Robert Kanigher
DC Comics supervillains
DC Comics male supervillains
Earth-Two
Fictional hypnotists and indoctrinators
Fictional musicians
Fictional thieves
Fictional violinists
Golden Age supervillains
Flash (comics) characters